The 2020–21 MSV Duisburg season was the 121st season in the club's football history. In 2020–21 the club played in the 3. Liga, the third tier of German football alongside the DFB-Pokal and the Lower Rhine Cup.

Team

Transfers

In

Out

New contracts

Friendlies

Competitions
Times from 1 July to 25 October 2020 and from 28 March to 30 June 2021 are UTC+2, from 26 October 2020 to 27 March 2021 UTC+1.

Overview

3. Liga

League table

Results summary

Result round by round

Matches

DFB-Pokal

Lower Rhine Cup
The tournament will be played by the seven highest-ranked teams in the german football league system.

Statistics

Squad statistics

‡ Player left the club mid-season

Goals

Clean sheets

Disciplinary record

Notes

References

External links

German football clubs 2020–21 season
MSV Duisburg seasons